Eternal Return is a multiplayer battle royale game developed by Nimble Neuron and published by Kakao Games. The game was released in early access on October 14, 2020. Eternal Return features a mix of multiplayer online battle arena gameplay with survival game elements. A player can choose one of the many characters already released and is pitted against 17 other players to survive and battle on an island called Lumia, with the last player standing being the winner. The game is currently available for Microsoft Windows via Steam and Microsoft Store, with versions for Xbox consoles and mobile in the works.

Gameplay 
18 players are spawned onto an island and are set against each other. The map, Lumia Island, has 16 distinct areas. The game uses battle royale mechanics, marking different areas of the map as restricted areas in lieu of the traditional closing circle. Players collect materials from various containers, slain animals or other players, or from various unique points around the map to create stronger weapons or equipment. There are multiple playable characters with different skills and abilities, similar to multiplayer online battle arena games. The final player or team alive is crowned the winner.

Plot
Eternal Return is set in the Lumia Island universe, taking place on a secluded island with various areas. A scientific organization known as AGLAIA is hosting an experiment with human test subjects as an experiment to further evolution and create an elite species of humans. After each experiment, the test subjects have their memory wiped.

Development

Eternal Return is developed by South Korean company Nimble Neuron and is developed in Unity.

In 2021, they partnered with Kakao Games to publish Eternal Return in Korea. In 2021, a music video featuring K-pop group aespa was created for the domestic launch of the Kakao Games client.

References 

2020 video games
Battle royale games
Early access video games
Multiplayer online battle arena games
Video games developed in South Korea
Video games set on fictional islands
Windows games
Windows-only games
Kakao Games games